Julie Mennella is a biopsychologist specializing in the development of food and flavor preferences in humans and the effects of alcohol and tobacco on women's health and infant development.  She currently works at the Monell Chemical Senses Center in Philadelphia, PA.

Some of her research has focused on how food preferences may be developed in the womb or during very early life.

Select publications
Mennella JA, Jagnow CJ, Beauchamp GK.  Prenatal and post-natal flavor learning by human infants.  Pediatrics 107: e88, 2001. 
Mennella JA, Ventura AK, Beauchamp, GK.  Differential growth patterns among healthy infants fed protein hydrolysate or cow-milk formulas. Pediatrics 127(1):110-8, 2011. .
Mennella JA, Lukasewycz LD, Castor SL, Beauchamp GK.  The timing and duration of a sensitive period in human flavor learning.  American Journal of Clinical Nutrition 93: 1019-1024, 2011. .
Mennella JA, Pepino MY.  Breastfeeding and prolactin levels in lactating women with a family history of alcoholism. Pediatrics 125: e1162-70, 2010. .
Mennella JA, Pepino, MY, Duke F, Reed DR.  Age modifies the genotype-phenotype relationship for the bitter receptor TAS2R38. BMC Genetics 11: 60, 2010. .
Mennella JA, Beauchamp GK. Optimizing oral medications for children.  Clinical Therapeutics, 30: 2120-2132; 2008. .
Forestell CA, Mennella JA. Early determinants of fruit and vegetable acceptance.  Pediatrics 120: 1247-54, 2007. 
Forestell CA, Mennella JA.  Children’s hedonic judgments of cigarette smoke odor: Effects of parental smoking and maternal mood. Psychology of Addictive Behaviors 19: 423-432, 2005. .
Mennella JA, Forestell CA.  Children’s hedonic responses to the odors of alcoholic beverages: A window to emotions. Alcohol 42:249-60, 2008. .

Awards and honors 
In 2016, she was named a distinguished practitioner fellow of the National Academy of Practice. In 2020, Mennella received the Max Mozell Award for outstanding achievement in the chemical sciences from the Association for Chemoreception Sciences.

References

External links
 Dr. Mennella's page on the Monell site.
 Healthier Societies, Long Lives

21st-century American biologists
Living people
Year of birth missing (living people)